Shane Tongerie (born 10 February 1971) is a former Australian rules footballer who played with Adelaide in the Australian Football League (AFL).

Tongerie played for Central District in the South Australian National Football League (SANFL) before being selected by Adelaide with the 18th pick of the 1994 Pre-Season Draft. He kicked three goals on debut, against the Brisbane Bears at the Gabba, after coming off the bench. However, in his next three games Tongerie had a combined total of just 11 disposals and lost his place in the side.

An Indigenous Australian, Tongerie was a member of the Aboriginal All-Stars team which defeated Collingwood by 20 points at Marrara Oval in Darwin in 1994.

References

1971 births
Australian rules footballers from South Australia
Adelaide Football Club players
Central District Football Club players
Indigenous Australian players of Australian rules football
Living people